Old Noll was a privateer operated by a group of merchants from Liverpool, England during the War of the Austrian Succession.

After a brief but successful career as a privateer, she was sunk in November 1745 by a French naval squadron from Brest.

References

Privateer ships of Great Britain
18th-century ships
Ships built in Norfolk, Virginia